George Howard Williams, (February 12, 1918 – May 18, 2003), was a president of American University (1968–1976). Williams received a BA from Hofstra University (formerly Hofstra College) and a law degree from New York University, where he became an instructor of law in 1948 and eventually executive vice president. He was a lieutenant colonel in World War II in North Africa and Europe. He won a Silver Star for bravery and other decorations and was held prisoner by the Germans for eight months before escaping. He became president of American University in 1968.

Notes

1918 births
2003 deaths
Leaders of American University
Hofstra University alumni
New York University School of Law alumni
Recipients of the Silver Star
20th-century American academics